On 4 May 1982, Australian Army personnel Robin Reid and Nicole Louise Pearce (birth name Paul Wayne Luckman) kidnapped teenage boys Peter Aston and Terry Ryan on the Gold Coast, Queensland. Reid and Pearce then drove the boys at gun and knife point to Kingscliff, New South Wales, where they were beaten, tortured, and sexually assaulted before Aston was ultimately murdered.

Kidnapping and murder 
Peter Aston and Terry Ryan were hitchhiking on the Gold Coast Highway and were picked up by Reid and Pearce, who offered to give the boys a lift down the coast.

Not long on the road, the two boys were threatened at knife and gunpoint by the two perpetrators, who then drove the car over the Queensland/New South Wales border, into the beach-side town of Kingscliff, where they forced the two boys out of the car and down a secluded beach track.

Reid and Pearce then bound, sexually assaulted, and savagely beat the two boys. Ryan was also forced by the two perpetrators to bash and assault his friend. Peter Aston was stabbed, tortured, and eventually buried alive. By this point, Terry Ryan had reasoned with his attackers and they agreed to drive him home.

Arrest and trial 
Reid and Pearce's committal hearing was held at Tweed Heads Court on 4 August. The case was transferred to the Sydney Supreme Court.

Reid and Pearce were convicted and sentenced to life imprisonment.

Aftermath 
Pearce underwent gender transition in 1990. Pearce was released in 1999.

 Reid has been refused parole six times.

References 

Murder in New South Wales
Murder in Queensland
Child sexual abuse in Australia
Crimes involving Satanism or the occult
1980s in Queensland
1980s in New South Wales
1982 murders in Australia